Elections for the Eastwood District Council took place on 1 May 1977, alongside elections to the councils of Scotland's various other districts.

The Conservatives maintained their dominance of the council, winning all but 2 of the Districts seats.

Aggregate results

Ward results

References

1977 Scottish local elections
1977